Western music may refer to:

 Western culture § Music, especially:
 Western classical music
 Western music (North America), a form of country music from the Western United States and Old West, including:
 New Mexico music
 Red Dirt (music)
 Tejano music
 Texas country music
 Western swing
 West Coast blues, USA
 Western Music (EP), a Will Oldham EP